Reconstructionism may refer to:
Christian Reconstructionism, a Calvinistic theological-political movement
Hellenic Polytheistic Reconstructionism, a revival of ancient Greek religion
Polytheistic reconstructionism, an approach to Neopaganism
Reconstructionist Judaism, a modern American-based Jewish movement
Zalmoxianism, a rebirth of ancient Dacian religion

See also
Reconstruction (disambiguation)
Reconstruction era, a period in American history following the American Civil War
Reconstructivism
The Reconstructionist, a magazine